The Lyttelton Road Tunnel Administration Building was built in the mid-1960s as an operational building for the Lyttelton road tunnel in Christchurch, New Zealand. The building was designed by architect Peter Beaven and is seen as significant in the development of New Zealand architecture.

When the building was commissioned, the Christchurch Lyttelton Road Tunnel Authority wanted an impressive structure that would reflect the importance of the newly built tunnel connection into Christchurch. The site of the building was additionally significant in being at the Christchurch end of the Bridle Path, where Canterbury's first settlers travelled along.

The building and the adjoining canopy were badly damaged during the 2011 Christchurch earthquake, and as a result the canopy was demolished and the building closed. The building itself was demolished in 2013.

References

Heritage New Zealand Category 1 historic places in Canterbury, New Zealand